Véronique Le Flaguais (born 30 November 1947 in Paris, France) is a French actress who has acted in many Canadian productions. Her work includes a Genie Award nomination for her supporting role in Surviving My Mother, Rumeurs, Jesus of Montreal (Jésus de Montréal), Cruising Bar and the sequel Cruising Bar 2. 

She is married to actor Michel Côté. Their son Maxime Le Flaguais is also an actor.

References

External links 
 

1947 births
Canadian film actresses
Canadian television actresses
French emigrants to Canada
Living people
Actresses from Paris
20th-century Canadian actresses
21st-century Canadian actresses
20th-century French women